= John Furber Dexter =

English collector

John Furber Dexter (12 December 1847, Kensington, London – 17 June 1927, Wandsworth, London) was an English collector of Charles Dickens's works. Following his death Dexter's collection remained in family hands before being purchased by the British Library in 1969 as the Dexter Collection of Dickensiana, which comprises primary and secondary Dickens material to support study, teaching, and research.
